McHenry School District 15 is a school district serving parts of McHenry County, Illinois.

Schools
There are six elementary schools serving students within the district:
 Chauncey H. Duker School
 Edgebrook Elementary School
 Hilltop Elementary School
 Landmark Elementary School
 Landmark opened its doors in 1895 and was converted to a year-round school in 2001. The school uses a multi-aged classroom approach to educate its students.
 Riverwood Elementary School
 Valley View Elementary School

There are two middle schools:

 McHenry Middle School
 Parkland School

References

External links
McHenry School District 15

School districts in Illinois
School districts in McHenry County, Illinois
McHenry, Illinois
1895 establishments in Illinois
School districts established in 1895